Song Yan-fei (born October 22, 1995), also known as Cecilia Boey, is a Chinese actress, singer and dancer. Song gained fame after joining Grade One Freshman and her roles in I'm Sorry It's not You (2017), Mr. Right (2018) and Walk Into Your Memory (2019).

Early life
Song was born on 22 October 1995 in Australia, and moved to Shanghai with her family when she was four years old. She attended Shanghai Theatre Academy.

Career

Pre-debut
Song was discovered by a South Korean talent scout when she was 15 and trained under JYP Entertainment from 2011 to 2014. She was supposed to debut with a girl group called 6MIX (later Twice), but Song suffered a serious knee injury and decided to leave the entertainment company. She went back to China to pursue a career in acting.

2015–present: Acting debut in China
Song returned to China and joined the cast of Grade One Freshman in 2015. Song made her large screen debut in The New Year's Eve of Old Lee (2016) playing the role as Lily. She was also cast in the television series Topple Your Ex-Girlfriend (2016), and I'm Sorry It's not You (2017) Where The Lost Ones Go (2017)  it her debut project. She had her first lead role Mr. Right and a cameo in Detective Chinatown 2. Her rising popularity led her to several main roles, iQiyi's Hero Dog 3, Tencent Video's Walk Into Your Memory and Ten Years Late in 2019.

She was cast in the LeTV romance drama Braveness of the Ming and Jade Lovers, both set to air in 2020.

Filmography

Film

Television series

Television shows

References

External links
 
 

1995 births
Living people
Australian emigrants to China
Chinese expatriates in South Korea
21st-century Chinese women singers
Chinese television actresses
21st-century Chinese actresses
Shanghai Theatre Academy alumni